Lighthouse Digest,  a specialty magazine from FogHorn Publishing in East Machias, Maine, is  about maritime history with particular attention to the preservation of lighthouses and their past. Though it is geared toward enthusiasts and antiquarians in the United States, it is also quoted commonly in more academic publications, and its editors have become a staple presence in scholarly circles.  Editor Tim Harrison issued the first number in May, 1992.

Scope
Coverage includes historic and current lighthouse events and an events calendar for lighthouse activities around the United States and elsewhere. They publish a "Doomsday List" of Endangered lighthouses, and have helped save a number of at-risk lighthouses.

They have been credited with uncovering many parts of lighthouse history that had been unknown, or which were thought to have been lost.

Each issue carries articles and unusual lighthouse-related stories that, for the most part, cannot be found elsewhere, and many photos, historic and contemporary.

Audience
Lighthouse Digest has subscribers in all 50 United States and 17 other nations. Currently it publishes six issues a year. The editor is Tim Harrison; the Managing editor is Kathleen Finnegan.

Doomsday List
The Doomsday List is a list of endangered lighthouses compiled by Lighthouse Digest. The list usually consists of lighthouses in the United States and Canada, but occasionally includes sites from other countries as well. Inclusion on the list raises awareness that a lighthouse is in trouble. The list is updated bi-yearly. Russ Rowlett keeps an annotated version of the Doomsday List on the Lighthouse Directory. He has also compiled a Watch List of other lighthouses he feels should be on the Doomsday List.

The Nova Scotia Lighthouse Preservation Society also holds a Doomsday List of Canadian endangered lighthouses, though according to Russ Rowlett it is not truly national in scope as most of the lighthouses listed are in Nova Scotia. Russ Rowlett keeps a more complete list with no official standing.

A similar list for lighthouses in Puerto Rico was constructed by Sandra Shanklin for the Lighthouse Digest in 2002.

References

External links
  Lighthouse Digest website

Lighthouses
Magazines established in 1992
1992 establishments in Maine
Hobby magazines published in the United States
History magazines published in the United States
Magazines published in Maine